Niizuki   was an  destroyer of the Imperial Japanese Navy.

Design and description
The Akizuki-class ships were originally designed as anti-aircraft escorts for carrier battle groups, but were modified with torpedo tubes and depth charges to meet the need for more general-purpose destroyer. Her crew numbered 300 officers and enlisted men.

The ship had two Kampon geared steam turbines, each driving one propeller shaft, using steam provided by three Kampon water-tube boilers.

The main armament of the Akizuki class consisted of eight Type 98  dual purpose guns in four twin-gun turrets, two superfiring pairs fore and aft of the superstructure. They carried four Type 96  anti-aircraft guns in two twin-gun mounts. The ships were also armed with four  torpedo tubes in a single quadruple traversing mount; one reload was carried for each tube. Their anti-submarine weapons comprised six depth charge throwers for which 72 depth charges were carried.

Construction and career
On the night of 4–5 July 1943, Niizuki led a troop transport run to Kolombangara. The attack, from a distance of 11 nautical miles (20 km), is believed to be longest-range successful torpedo attack in history.

On the night of 5–6 July 1943, Niizuki led another troop transport run to Kolombangara. All 290 people including the captain, the crew, and the command of 3rd Destroyer squadron were killed.

Wreck
Niizuki'''s wreck was discovered by RV Petrel in January 2019. She sits upright in 745 meters (2,444 feet) of water and is heavily damaged. Surprisingly, her mast is still attached and completely upright. The wreck's discovery is noteworthy in that no photos of Niizuki'' in service are known to exist.

Notes

References

External links
 CombinedFleet.com: Akizuki-class destroyers
 CombinedFleet.com: Niizuki history
CombinedFleet.com: ''Niizuki'''s last mission

Akizuki-class destroyers (1942)
World War II destroyers of Japan
Shipwrecks in the Solomon Sea
1942 ships
Maritime incidents in July 1943
Ships lost with all hands
Shipwreck discoveries by Paul Allen
World War II shipwrecks in the Pacific Ocean
2019 archaeological discoveries